École Gabrielle-Roy is a French first language elementary and high school in Surrey, British Columbia, Canada. It serves the francophone population of the Greater Vancouver Regional District. The school was built at the new location after the previous one burned down due to a fire started by fireworks in the school's library. The school is named in honour of French Canadian author Gabrielle Roy. École Gabrielle-Roy now has the International Baccalaureate Intermediate and Diploma programs for grades 7 to 12.

Special programs

IB Programme 
École Gabrielle-Roy offers an International Baccalaureate Programme in French. The IB classes included français, anglais, histoire, chimie, biologie, mathématiques, musique de groupe, théorie de la connaissance (TDC), mémoire et créativité, action, service (CAS).

Études Autochtones 
Members of the Provincial Native Parents Committee, students and staff members have signed a first "Aboriginal Education Enhancement Agreement" with the Chair of the CSF Board of Governors, the Minister of Education of British Columbia, and representatives of indigenous communities. For more details about the agreement you can consult the official documents on the following sites:

http://www.bced.gov.bc.ca/abed/agreements/sd93_french.pdf

http://www.bced.gov.bc.ca/abed/agreements/sd93_moa.pdf

Parents of children with an Aboriginal heritage can identify themselves on the CSF school registration forms. By Aboriginal heritage, we mean First Nations, Métis, Inuit, and non-status Aboriginal people. Any child identified as having an Aboriginal heritage is eligible. The Aboriginal ancestor can be a parent, grandparent, great-grandparent, etc. Funding provided by the Department of Education for this program is used to enhance academic, language and cultural programs for identified children. Parents are encouraged to engage in the process of developing a curriculum for their children.

Services

Technology 
All students at Gabrielle-Roy are given access to a personal laptop computer as an educational tool for the remainder of their time at Gabrielle-Roy. From grade 10 till 12, the students are given the privilege to take their laptop home as a tool to complete their school work. The student laptops are also are an essential to take online classes with École Virtuelle. In addition, Gabrielle-Roy issues an e-mail address for all students and staff, has a library with computers for research assignments and communication, and Smart Boards in a number of classrooms.

Pre and After School Care 
Pre-school and after-school child care is also provided by Les Papillons of the Association francophone de Surrey.

Diplomas available

References

External links
 École Gabrielle-Roy de Surrey
http://www.csf.bc.ca/, Le Conseil scolaire francophone, BC Francophone School Division

Elementary schools in Surrey, British Columbia
French-language schools in British Columbia
High schools in Surrey, British Columbia
International Baccalaureate schools in British Columbia
Educational institutions established in 1998
1998 establishments in British Columbia